Rémy Ollier (October 6, 1816, 1845) was a journalist, author, and political activist of Mauritius.

Childhood 
Rémy Ollier was the son of Benoît Ollier, a French artillery captain, who had settled in Beau-Vallon around 1799, and Julie Guillemeau, a freed slave. Like other settlers (and rich creoles), Rémy's father owned slaves.

Life 
Young Rémy had an easy childhood and was a brilliant student with a talent for literature. In 1832, Ollier was deeply impressed by the conflict between the abolitionist John Jeremie, sent by the British government to end slavery, and the French slave owners in Mauritius. When Ollier was 16 years old, his father died. His family moved to the street in Port Louis which bears his name today. He had to stop his studies and take a job as an apprentice in a saddlery. In 1838, he married Louise Adrienne Ferret. The couple had two children, a daughter, Sidonie, and a son, Ogé Louis Benoit. In 1841, he and his wife founded a school in Rue d'Entrecasteaux, Port Louis. He also worked as a French tutor in the schools of Port Louis.

At 21, he became a spokesman for the emancipation of the gens de couleur. Since the newspapers were controlled by the oligarchy of the sugarcane planters, Ollier helped found the weekly newspaper La Sentinelle de Maurice in April 1843. La Sentinelle was published alongside the English-language The Mauritius Watchman. 

In his writings he persistently advocated political and civil equality through a common British subjecthood. In 1843, together with Edward Baker, his partner in the Sentinelle newspaper, he addressed a petition to Queen Victoria asking for the election of coloured representatives, which would strengthen the loyalty of this community to the British Crown.

His criticism of capital punishment and barbarous prison conditions led to improvements. When the newspaper Le Cernéen, run by the white planters oligarchy, was struck with a libel suit, Ollier defended his political enemy in the name of press freedom. Although he was violently assaulted by thugs and thrown into prison, Ollier continued writing.

Rémy Ollier succeeded in convincing the English colonial government to open the scholarship system to non-white applicants, and in 1844 the first two coloured students travelled to England.

Ollier died, only 28 years old, officially of intestinal inflammation. Rumours of foul play by his political adversaries continued to circulate, and until today the circumstances of his death remain unclear.

Legacy 

All major towns and many villages in Mauritius have a street called Rue Rémy Ollier or Avenue Rémy Ollier, and many schools are named after him.

A bust of the activist was erected in the Jardin de la Compagnie in Port Louis in 1908 and his 100th anniversary celebrated there 8 years later. 

In the 20th century, the Mauritian writer and political leader Basdeo Bissoondoyal called Ollier a "Ghandiate before Gandhi".

Gallery

References 

 
 
 
 

1816 births
1845 deaths
Civil rights activists
19th-century journalists
Mauritian_journalists
19th-century Mauritian writers

1830s_in_Mauritius
1840s_in_Mauritius